Clonmel Óg GAA is a Gaelic Athletic Association gaelic football club located outside the town of Clonmel in Ireland. The club is part of the South division of Tipperary GAA and were formed in 1984 to cater for the large urban population outside the town of Clonmel.

History
The club was founded in 1984

Achievements
Tipperary Intermediate Football Championship (1) 2008, 2017
South Tipperary Minor A Hurling Championship (1) 2018 (with Skeheenarinky)
South Tipperary Intermediate Football Championship (1) 2008, 2017
South Tipperary Junior Football Championship (2) 1995, 1997
Tipperary Junior B Football Championship (1) 2009
South Tipperary Junior B Football Championship (2) 2009, 2013
South Tipperary Junior B Hurling Championship (1) 2000
Tipperary Under-21 B Football Championship (1) 2006
South Tipperary Under-21 B Football Championship (3) 2005, 2006, 2012
South Tipperary Under-21 C Football Championship (1) 2000
South Tipperary Minor Football Championship (1) 1990
South Tipperary Minor B Hurling Championship (1) 2016 (with Skeheenarinky)

References

External links
Official Site
GAA Info Website
Tipperary GAA site

Gaelic games clubs in County Tipperary
Clonmel